Clara Napaga Tia Sulemana (born 1987) is a female Ghanaian politician and a presidential staffer of the  Nana Akufo-Addo led government. She is the daughter of  Alhaji Tia Sulemana, a founding father of the New Patriotic Party in Ghana.

Education 
Napaga had her Bachelor of Arts Degree in Integrated Development Studies with focus in social, political and historical studies  from the University for Development Studies.

Career 
Upon completion of her undergraduate study, Napaga started her journey in politics as a campaign aide to the New Patriotic Party (NPP). She was later appointed as a presidential staffer when the party won the 2016 presidential elections. Sulemana sits on the governing board of the Tamale Teaching Hospital. In 2022 when the NPP government decided to scrap off the Ministry for Special Development Initiatives (MSDI) as one of the measures by the government to reduce the number of Ministries and ministers in its second term, she was then appointed as Coordinator for Special Development Initiatives.

References 

1987 births
Living people
21st-century Ghanaian women politicians
New Patriotic Party politicians
University for Development Studies alumni